Hampton Yeats Dellinger (born April 30, 1967) is an American attorney and political candidate serving as the United States Assistant Attorney General for Legal Policy. He was previously a partner at Boies, Schiller & Flexner and Robinson, Bradshaw, and Hinson.

Education 

Dellinger earned a Bachelor of Arts degree from the University of Michigan and a Juris Doctor from Yale Law School.

Career 

From January 2001 to June 2003, he served as legal counsel for Governor Mike Easley. From July 2001 to June 2003, he also served as a member of the governor's advisory council on Hispanic/Latino affairs. From July 2003 to January 2008, he was a partner with the firm Womble Carlyle.

From 2008 to 2013, Dellinger was a lawyer in the office of Robinson, Bradshaw & Hinson and a candidate for the 2008 Democratic nomination for lieutenant governor of North Carolina. In his first run for elective office, he lost the Democratic primary on May 6, 2008 to Walter H. Dalton. From 2013 to 2020, he was a partner at the Washington, D.C. office of Boies Schiller Flexner LLP. He has been practicing as a solo practitioner since November 2020.

In 2009, Senator Kay Hagan recommended Dellinger and two other lawyers to President Barack Obama for consideration as U.S. Attorney for the Eastern District of North Carolina. Obama eventually nominated attorney Thomas G. Walker instead.

On October 28, 2021, the U.S. Senate voted 53-37 to confirm Dellinger as the United States Department of Justice's Assistant Attorney General for the Office of Legal Policy. He was sworn in on November 1, 2021.

Personal life 

Dellinger is the son of the late law professor and former acting Solicitor General of the United States, Walter E. Dellinger III.

References

External links
Boies, Schiller & Flexner profile
News & Observer profile page

1967 births
Living people
North Carolina Democrats
North Carolina lawyers
People from Oxford, Mississippi
University of Michigan alumni
Yale Law School alumni
Boies Schiller Flexner people
Biden administration personnel
United States Assistant Attorneys General for the Office of Legal Policy